Patterson v. Colorado, 205 U.S. 454 (1907), was a First Amendment case.  Before 1919, the primary legal test used in the United States to determine if speech could be criminalized was the  bad tendency test. Rooted in English common law, the test permitted speech to be outlawed if it had a tendency to harm public welfare.  One of the earliest cases the Supreme Court heard addressing punishment after material was published was   1907's Patterson v. Colorado in which the Court used the bad tendency test to uphold contempt charges against a newspaper publisher who accused Colorado judges of acting on behalf of local utility companies.

See also
 List of United States Supreme Court cases, volume 205

Footnotes

References
Rabban, David, Free Speech in Its Forgotten Years, Cambridge University Press, 1999,

External links

1907 in United States case law
United States Supreme Court cases
United States Free Speech Clause case law
United States due process case law
United States Supreme Court cases of the Fuller Court